

History 

Gota is a developing residential locality in north-west Ahmedabad. The area witnessed a construction boom post development of SG Highway which connects Gota with the rest of the city. 
Gota was added to Ahmedabad Municipal Corporation and comes under Ward No. - 1 in New West Zone.

References

Cities and towns in Ahmedabad district
Neighbourhoods in Ahmedabad